Oguzhan District   (formerly Nyýazow District and Parakhat District) is a district of Mary Province in Turkmenistan. The administrative center of the district is the town of Gulanly.

Founded in 1988 as Parakhat District, it became part of Mary since 1992 where its name is changed into Nyýazow District before adopting its current name, Oguzhan.

It is named after Oghuz Khan, a legendary and semimythological khan of the Turkic peoples. Its former name, Nyýazow, is named after Saparmurat Niyazov, the first president of Turkmenistan.  

Districts of Turkmenistan
Mary Region